The women's doubles badminton event at the 2011 Pan American Games was held from October 15–19 at the Multipurpose Gymnasium in Guadalajara. The defending Pan American Games champions were Eva Lee and Mesinee Mangkalakiri of the United States, while the defending Pan American Championship champions were Grace Gao and Joycelyn Ko of Canada. The women's doubles was the first badminton event to be completed at the Games.

The athletes were drawn into an elimination stage draw. Once a team lost a match it was no longer able to compete. Each match was contested as the best of three games.

The draw for the competition was done on October 7, 2011.

Seeds

  (finals)
  (champions)
  (semifinals)
  (semifinals)

Results

Finals

Top Half

Bottom Half

References

External links
Draw with results

Women's Doubles